Orco Puñuna (possibly from Quechua urqu mountain; male, puñuna bed, "mountain bed") is a mountain in the western extensions of the Vilcanota mountain range in the Andes of Peru, about  high. It is situated in the Cusco Region, Canchis Province, Pitumarca District, east of Sibinacocha. Orco Puñuna lies south of the mountain Othaña and southwest of the mountains Cóndor Tuco, Chuallani and Yana Orjo.

References

Mountains of Cusco Region
Mountains of Peru